Homalopteroides nebulosus is a species of ray-finned fish in the genus Homalopteroides. It can be found in Malaysia and Indonesia.

References

Balitoridae
Fish described in 1969